Fitz is a male given name and nickname which may refer to:

Given name
 Fitz, American radio personality and host of Bob Kingsley's Country Top 40
 Fitz Babbitt (1790–1815), United States Navy lieutenant in the War of 1812
 Fitz Boothby (1861–1889), Scottish golfer
 Fitz Eugene Dixon Jr. (1923–2006), American educator, sportsman and philanthropist
 Fitz W. Guerin (1846-1903), American photographer and Civil War Medal of Honor recipient
 Fitz Hall (born 1980), English soccer player
 Fitz Jackson, Jamaican politician
 Fitz Henry Lane (1804-1865), American painter and printmaker born Nathaniel Rogers Lane
 Fitz Lee (Medal of Honor) (1866-1899), African-American United States Army soldier and Medal of Honor recipient
 Fitz Hugh Ludlow (1836-1870), American author, journalist, and explorer, best known for his autobiographical book The Hasheesh Eater
 Fitz James O'Brien (1828-1862), Irish-born American writer
 Fitz John Porter (1822-1901), Union Army general in the American Civil War
 Fitz Remedios Santana de Souza (born 1929), Kenyan lawyer and politician
 Fitz Steele (born 1965), American politician
 Fitz Henry Warren (1816-1878), American politician and Union Army general

Nickname
 Fitzhugh L. Fulton (1925–2015), US Air Force retired lieutenant colonel and civilian research pilot
 Michael "Fitz" Fitzpatrick (born 1970), American singer-songwriter and frontman of Fitz and the Tantrums
 Delmont "Fitz" Hinds (1880–?), West Indian cricketer
 Fitzhugh Lee (1835–1905), Confederate Civil War general and Governor of Virginia, called Fitz by contemporaries
 Fitzroy "Fitz" Vanderpool (born 1967), Canadian professional boxer

Fictional Characters
 Fitzroy Avery Vacker, a character in the Keeper Of The Lost Cities book series by Shannon Messenger

See also
 
 Fitz (patronymic)
 Fitz (surname)
 John F. Fitzgerald (1863–1950), known as "Honey Fitz", American politician and grandfather of President John F. Kennedy

Masculine given names
Hypocorisms